Eringanerin Parish, New South Wales is a bounded rural locality of Gilgandra Shire and a civil parish of Gowen County, New South Wales.

Geography
The only town of the county is Gilgandra, seat of the shire.

The parish is on the Castlereagh River and Great Australian Basin and, specifically, over the Surat Sub-basin of the GAB.

History
In 1888 Gilgandra township was proclaimed, and the first town blocks were sold in 1889 though as postal service (1867), school (1881) and court house (1884) were already established. The Council was constituted in 1906.
During World War I, the so-called Coo-ee recruitment march to Sydney began here.

References

Localities in New South Wales
Geography of New South Wales
Central West (New South Wales)